The 1998 Sta. Lucia Realtors season was the sixth season of the franchise in the Philippine Basketball Association (PBA).

Draft pick

Summary
Under new coach Derrick Pumaren, Sta.Lucia won their first four games in the All-Filipino Cup. However, the Realtors lost their last five outings in the eliminations and dropped to five wins and six losses. In the semifinal round, the Realtors won four of their first five games which includes victories over the top two teams, Alaska and San Miguel. The Realtors clinch a playoff spot for a second finals berth via win 7-of-10 semifinals incentive when it defeated Purefoods Carne Norte Beefies, 92-77 on April 14. Having beaten the Alaska Milkmen twice in the semifinals, the Sta.Lucia Realtors blew a golden opportunity to advance in the finals series for the first time in franchise history when they bowed to the Milkmen, 69-77, in their playoff game on April 21 for the right to face San Miguel Beermen for the All-Filipino Cup crown.

In the Commissioner's Cup, after losing their first game to San Miguel in Urdaneta, Pangasinan, Sta.Lucia import Melvin Cheatum abandoned the team and left quickly, he could only score four points in a brief stint. The Realtors scored their first win in their next game playing all-Filipino. Former Pepsi import and one-time best import awardee Ronnie Coleman is on his third year of duty and was tapped to play for Sta.Lucia. The Realtors ended up last place in the conference.

Sans the duo of Jun Limpot and Dennis Espino, who were members of the national team, the Realtors chalk up only one win in eight outings during the Centennial Cup and their lone victory came after replacing imports Jojo English and Kirk King with the tandem of Andre Perry and Bobby Allen, who played for Sta.Lucia three years ago. With one game left in their Centennial Cup campaign, Allen was replaced by Joseph Temple, who teamed up with Perry for the rest of their games in the Governor's Cup. The Realtors won four of their next seven matches but still fell short and placed last anew.

Notable dates
February 3: Jun Limpot scored a game-high 34 points as the Realtors thrashed the Shell Zoom Masters, 85-69.

February 15: Sta.Lucia leads by 20 points in the second half and coasted to an 83-72 rout off Pop Cola for its fourth straight win and leadership in the All-Filipino Cup.

March 24: Ronnie Magsanoc canned two free throws off Johnny Abarrientos' foul to hold back title favorite Alaska Milkmen, 77-74, for its second win in three starts in the semifinals.

March 27: The Realtors bested San Miguel Beermen for the first time in the season, 78-70, with Jack Santiago filled in Magsanoc's shoes nicely as he scored a career high 18 points.

Roster

Team Manager: Manuel Encarnado

Transactions

Trades

Recruited imports

References

Sta. Lucia
Sta. Lucia Realtors seasons